Moving In is an album by saxophonist Chris Potter. It was recorded in 1996 and released later that year by Concord. It features Potter in a quartet with pianist Brad Mehldau, bassist Larry Grenadier and drummer Billy Hart.

Music and recording
Potter plays tenor sax on most of the tracks. He switches to soprano sax for "Book of Kells" and "A Kiss to Build a Dream On". On "Chorale", he plays bass clarinet. The title track is played in 5/4 time.

Reception
The AllMusic reviewer wrote that "Concept-wise, this isn't Potter's boldest offering. But the playing is emotionally charged and technically superb." The Chicago Tribune reviewer commented that Potter's album was "the boldest recording of his career".

Track listing
"Nero's Fiddle" – 7:02
"Book Of Kells" – 7:20
"Moving In" – 6:33
"A Kiss to Build a Dream On" – 7:24
"Rhubarb" – 7:24
"South for the Winter" – 7:16
"The Forest" – 8:40
"Pelog" – 5:18
"Chorale" – 4:54
"Old Faithful" – 6:25

Personnel
 Chris Potter – tenor sax, soprano sax, bass clarinet
 Brad Mehldau – piano
 Larry Grenadier – bass
 Billy Hart – drums

References

1996 albums
Chris Potter (jazz saxophonist) albums
Concord Records albums